Corey Ford (April 29, 1902 – July 27, 1969) was an American humorist, writer, outdoorsman, and screenwriter. He was friendly with several members of the Algonquin Round Table in New York City and occasionally lunched there.

Early years
Ford was a member of the Class of 1923 at Columbia College of Columbia University, where he edited the humor magazine Jester of Columbia, and wrote the Varsity Show Half Moon Inn and Columbia's primary fight song, "Roar, Lion, Roar". He also joined, and was expelled from, the Philolexian Society. Failing to graduate, he embarked on a career as a freelance writer and humorist. In the 1930s he was noted for satirical sketches of books and authors penned under the name "John Riddell". Theodore Dreiser was shown adopting the guise of a common workman building his newest and biggest novel from bricks and mortar. He reviewed Dead Lovers are Faithful Lovers as "Dead Novelists are Good Novelists." 

Ford's series of "Impossible Interviews" for Vanity Fair magazine featured ill-assorted celebrities, among them Stalin vs. John D. Rockefeller, Chief Justice Charles Evans Hughes vs. Al Capone, Sigmund Freud vs. Jean Harlow, Sally Rand vs. Martha Graham, Gertrude Stein vs. Gracie Allen, Adolf Hitler vs. Huey Long.

Ford published 30 books and more than 500 magazine articles, many of them marked with a gregarious sense of humor, a love of dogs and "underdogs." He told many stories of the literary scene in the twenties, of headhunters in Dutch Borneo, of U.S. airmen in combat during World War II. He loved conversation and comradeship and was a great listener as well.

Ford created the name Eustace Tilley for the dandyish, top-hatted symbol of The New Yorker magazine. According to Ford's memoir, The Time of Laughter, the last name came from a maiden aunt and he chose the first name "for euphony".

Ford lived in Hanover, New Hampshire in the 1950's and 1960's where sponsored the Dartmouth Boxing Club (there was no sanctioned Dartmouth Boxing Team). Members of the club trained in Ford's basement where he built a gym with a boxing ring, light and heavy bags and boxing gloves. He also built a basement locker room for club members. A Dartmouth art professor, a friend of Ford's would recruit artist models from members of the Dartmouth Boxing Club.

The Lower Forty Hunting, Shooting and Inside Straight Club

Ford wrote a monthly column, "The Lower Forty Hunting, Shooting and Inside Straight Club", for Field & Stream for almost 20 years in the 1950s and 1960s.  

The column told about a fictional group of New England sportsmen, detailing the club members' adventures in and around the town of Hardscrabble, Vermont.  The primary characters in the column were Colonel Cobb, Judge Parker, Cousin Sid, Uncle Perk, Doc Hall, and Mister McNabb. The columns have been anthologized into several books such as Minutes of the Lower Forty, Uncle Perk's Jug, and The Corey Ford Sporting Treasury.

Bibliography

Books
 
 
 
 
 
 
 
 
 
 
 Cloak and Dagger, 1946
 The Last Time I Saw Them, 1946
 Horse of Another Color, 1946
 A Man Of His Own, 1949
 How To Guess Your Age, 1950
 The Office Party, 1951
 Every Dog Should Have A Man, 1952
 Never Say Diet, 1954
 Has Anybody Seen Me Lately?, 1958
 You Can Always Tell A Fisherman(but can't tell him much), 1958
 The Day Nothing Happened, 1959
 Guide To Thimking, 1961
 What Every Bachelor Knows, 1961
 Minutes of the Lower Forty, 1962
 And How Do We Feel This Morning?, 1964
 Uncle Perk's Jug, 1964
 A Peculiar Service, 1965
 Where The Sea Breaks Its Back, 1966
 The Time of Laughter, 1967
 Donovan of OSS, 1970 (posthumously)

Essays, reporting and other short pieces

Filmography

 The Sophomore (1929) aka Compromised in the UK
 The Sport Parade (1932)
 The Half-Naked Truth (1932)
 Her Bodyguard (1933)
 Topper Takes a Trip (1938)
 Start Cheering (1938)
 Remember? (1939)
 Winter Carnival (1939)
 Zenobia (1939) aka Elephants Never Forget in the UK, and It's Spring Again in the US
 Cloak and Dagger (1946)

Notes

External links
 
 The Papers of Corey Ford at Dartmouth College Library
 Dartmouth Women's Rugby: Corey Ford Rugby Clubhouse

Columbia College (New York) alumni
The New Yorker people
1902 births
1969 deaths
American humorists
20th-century American writers
20th-century American male writers
Algonquin Round Table